Kaijutitan (meaning "Kaiju titan" after the type of Japanese movie monsters) is a genus of basal titanosaur dinosaur from the Sierra Barrosa Formation from Neuquén Province in Argentina. The type and only species is Kaijutitan maui.

Discovery and naming 
Kaijutitan was discovered by a team of researchers from the Museo Municipal Argentino Urquiza and the Museo Provincial de Ciencias Naturales “Prof. Dr. Juan Olsacher" from a layer from the Sierra Barrosa Formation, in Cañadón Mistringa, about 9 km southwest of the city of Rincón de los Sauces, in Neuquen, Argentina.

Description 
Kaijutitan is known from the holotype MAU-Pv-CM-522, stored at the Museo Municipal Argentino Urquiza, Paleontología de Vertebrados, Cañadón Mistringa, which is a partial skeleton preserving elements from several parts of the skeleton.

Classification 
To test the systematic position of Kaijutitan, a phylogenetic analysis was conducted to resolve its affinities. A simplified cladogram, showing the results of the analysis, is presented below.

References 

Titanosaurs
Coniacian life
Late Cretaceous dinosaurs of South America
Cretaceous Argentina
Fossil taxa described in 2019